Ali Waqas (born 26 December 1989) is a Pakistani cricketer. He was the leading run-scorer for Sui Northern Gas Pipelines Limited in the 2018–19 Quaid-e-Azam One Day Cup, with 237 runs in six matches.

References

External links
 

1989 births
Living people
Pakistani cricketers
Faisalabad cricketers
Cricketers from Sargodha
Faisalabad Wolves cricketers
Sui Northern Gas Pipelines Limited cricketers
Central Punjab cricketers
South Asian Games bronze medalists for Pakistan
South Asian Games medalists in cricket